In Lie theory and representation theory, the Levi decomposition, conjectured by Wilhelm Killing and Élie Cartan and proved by , states that any finite-dimensional real Lie algebra g is  the semidirect product of  a solvable ideal and a semisimple subalgebra.
One is its radical, a maximal solvable ideal, and the other is a semisimple subalgebra, called a Levi subalgebra. The Levi decomposition implies that any finite-dimensional Lie algebra is a semidirect product of a solvable Lie algebra and a semisimple Lie algebra.
 
When viewed as a factor-algebra of g, this semisimple Lie algebra is also called the Levi factor of g. To a certain extent, the decomposition can be used to reduce problems about finite-dimensional Lie algebras and Lie groups to separate problems about Lie algebras in these two special classes, solvable and semisimple.

Moreover, Malcev (1942) showed that any two Levi subalgebras are conjugate by an (inner) automorphism of the form

where z is in the nilradical (Levi–Malcev theorem).

An analogous result is valid for associative algebras and is called the Wedderburn principal theorem.

Extensions of the results

In representation theory, Levi decomposition of parabolic subgroups of a reductive group is needed to construct a large family of the so-called parabolically induced representations. The Langlands decomposition is a slight refinement of the Levi decomposition for parabolic subgroups used in this context.

Analogous statements hold for simply connected Lie groups, and, as shown by George Mostow, for algebraic Lie algebras and simply connected algebraic groups over a field of characteristic zero.
 
There is no analogue of the Levi decomposition for most infinite-dimensional Lie algebras; for example affine Lie algebras have a radical consisting of their center, but cannot be written as a semidirect product of the center and another Lie algebra. The Levi decomposition also fails for finite-dimensional algebras over fields of positive characteristic.

See also 
Lie group decompositions

References

Bibliography

 Reprinted in: Opere Vol. 1, Edizione Cremonese, Rome (1959), p. 101.
.

External links

Lie algebras